Pallab Lochan Das (born December 31, 1978 in Biswanath Chariali, Assam) is a Bharatiya Janata Party politician from Assam. He was elected in Assam Legislative Assembly election in 2011 (from Behali Vidhan Sabha constituency)  and 2016 from Rangapara constituency. He is the current Member of Parliament from Tezpur (Lok Sabha constituency). He became a minister in the Sarbananda Sonowal-led government in 2016.

References 

Living people
Indian National Congress politicians
Lok Sabha members from Assam
Bharatiya Janata Party politicians from Assam
India MPs 2019–present
People from Lakhimpur district
State cabinet ministers of Assam
Assam MLAs 2011–2016
Assam MLAs 2016–2021
1978 births